Herbert Ernest Banks (19 June 1874 – 1947) was an English footballer who made over 40 appearances in the Football League, over 20 appearances in the Scottish League and over 40 appearances in the Southern League, scoring over 60 goals in a career as an inside left.

Career
Banks played for Everton, St Mirren (on loan for one Scottish Cup tie), Third Lanark, Millwall Athletic, Aston Villa, Bristol City, Watford, Coventry City and Stafford Rangers. During his time at Millwall, Banks made an appearance for the English national side, in a 3–0 British Home Championship win against Ireland. At Watford, his goalscoring rate exceeded a goal per game.

References

External links

Player profile at the FA.com

1874 births
English footballers
England international footballers
Everton F.C. players
Millwall F.C. players
Aston Villa F.C. players
Watford F.C. players
Coventry City F.C. players
St Mirren F.C. players
Third Lanark A.C. players
Bristol City F.C. players
Stafford Rangers F.C. players
1947 deaths
Association football forwards